Shirasaki (written: 白崎 lit. "white cape") is a Japanese surname. Notable people with the surname include:

, Japanese jazz musician
, Japanese baseball player
, Japanese footballer

Fictional characters:
, a character in the visual novel Daitoshokan no Hitsujikai

See also
12326 Shirasaki, a main-belt minor planet

Japanese-language surnames